Sipiyəpart (also, Sipiyət, Sipiya, and Sipiyad) is a village and municipality in the Astara Rayon of Azerbaijan.  It has a population of 616.  The municipality consists of the villages of Sipiyəpart and Çükəş.

References 

Populated places in Astara District